Stephen Thomas Wegener (born November 20, 1952) is an American rehabilitation psychologist specializing in the psychology of pain management. His work seeks to improve function and reduce disability for persons with chronic illness and impairments, including occupational injuries, rheumatic disease, spinal cord injury or limb loss. He also develops cognitive-behavioral therapy and self-management to prevent or mitigate pain associated with disability, and examines psychological variables that can affect positive outcomes.

Life and career
Wegener was born in St. Louis, MO and moved to Easton, Maryland in his late childhood. He earned his Bachelor of Arts degree in psychology in 1975 from Loyola College (now Loyola University Maryland). While there he was a member of the National Jesuit Honor Society and won the Whelan Psychology Medal. He completed a doctorate in clinical psychology at St. Louis University. He taught at University of Virginia before taking a position at Johns Hopkins. Wegener is currently Director of the Division of Rehabilitation Psychology at The Johns Hopkins School of Medicine.

In 2001 he was Distinguished Lecturer at the American College of Rheumatology /Association of Rheumatology Health Professionals Annual Scientific Meeting. In 2004 he was visiting professor at the Harry S. Truman Memorial Veterans' Hospital and at University of Missouri in Columbia, Missouri. He is on the board of the American Board of Rehabilitation Psychology since 2002 and has served as vice president since 2007. Wegener lectured in the Department of Rehabilitative Science at Hong Kong Polytechnic University in 2008. He was a Fulbright Scholar in 2008–2009.

Selected publications
Boult C, Reider L, Leff B, Frick KD, Boyd CM, Wolff JL, Frey K, Karm L, Wegener ST, Mroz T, Scharfstein DO (2011). The effect of guided care teams on the use of health services: results from a cluster-randomized controlled trial. Arch Intern Med. 2011 Mar 14;171(5):460-6. 
Wegener ST, Castillo RC, Haythornthwaite J, Mackenzie EJ, Bosse MJ; for the LEAP Study Group (2011). Psychological distress mediates the effect of pain on function. Pain . 2011 Jun;152(6):1349-1357. Epub 2011 Mar 10. 
Archer KR, Wegener ST, Seebach C, Song Y, Skolasky RL, Thornton C, Khanna AJ, Riley LH 3rd (2011). The Effect of Fear-Avoidance Beliefs on Pain and Disability after Surgery for Lumbar and Cervical Degenerative Conditions. Spine (Phila Pa 1976). 
Skolasky RL, Green AF, Scharfstein D, Boult C, Reider L, Wegener ST (2010). Psychometric properties of the patient activation measure among multimorbid older adults. Health Serv Res. 2011 Apr;46(2):457-78. . Epub 2010 Nov 19. 
Kortte KB, Gilbert M, Gorman P, Wegener ST (2010). Positive psychological variables in the prediction of life satisfaction after spinal cord injury. Rehabil Psychol. 2010 Feb;55(1):40-7. 
Skolasky RL, Mackenzie EJ, Riley LH 3rd, Wegener ST (2009). Psychometric properties of the Patient Activation Measure among individuals presenting for elective lumbar spine surgery. Qual Life Res. 2009 Dec;18(10):1357-66. Epub 2009 Nov 15. 
Wolff JL, Giovannetti ER, Boyd CM, Reider L, Palmer S, Scharfstein D, Marsteller J, Wegener ST, Frey K, Leff B, Frick KD, Boult C (2010). Effects of guided care on family caregivers. Gerontologist. 2010 Aug;50(4):459-70. Epub 2009 Aug 26.  
Kortte KB, Veiel L, Batten SV, Wegener ST (2009). Measuring avoidance in medical rehabilitation. Rehabil Psychol. 2009 Feb;54(1):91-8. 
Schaffalitzky E, NiMhurchadha S, Gallagher P, Hofkamp S, MacLachlan M, Wegener ST (2009). Identifying the values and preferences of prosthetic users: a case study series using the repertory grid technique. Prosthet Orthot Int. 2009 Jun;33(2):157-66. 
Wegener ST, Mackenzie E, Ephraim P, Ehde D, Williams R (2009). Self-management Improves Outcomes in Persons with Limb Loss. Archives of Physical Medicine and Rehabilitation  
Skolasky RL, Mackenzie EJ, Wegener ST, Riley LH III (2008). Patient activation and adherence to physical therapy in persons undergoing spine surgery. Spine, 2008. 
Boult C, Reider L, Frey K, Leff B, Boyd CM, Wolff JL, Wegener S, Marsteller J, Karm L, Scharfstein D (2008). Multidimensional geriatric assessment: back to the future early effects of "guided care" on the quality of health care for multimorbid older persons: a cluster-randomized controlled trial. J Gerontol A Biol Sci Med Sci. Mar;63(3):321-7
Hofkamp, SE, Henrikson, CA, Wegener, ST. (2007) An interactive model of pain and myocardial ischemia. Psychosomatic Medicine, 69(7), 632–9.  
Boyd C, Boult C, Shadmi E, Leff B, Brager R, Dunbar L, Wolff J, Wegener ST (2007). Guided Care for Multi-Morbid Older Adults. The Gerontologist 47, 697–704. 
Kortte KB, Falk LD, Johnson-Greene D, Wegener ST (2007). The Hopkins Rehabilitation Engagement Rating Scale: Psychometric Properties and Utility. Archives of Physical Medicine and Rehabilitation.  88, 877–884. 
Wegener ST (2006). Clinical Care in the Rheumatic Disease. American College of Rheumatology, 
Ephraim PL, MacKenzie EJ, Wegener ST, Dillingham TR, Pezzin LE (2006). Environmental barriers experienced by amputees: the Craig Hospital Inventory of Environmental Factors-Short Form. Arch Phys Med Rehabil. 2006 Mar;87(3):328-33. 
Ephraim PL, Wegener ST, MacKenzie EJ, Dillingham TR, Pezzin LE (2005). Phantom pain, residual limb pain, and back pain in amputees: results of a national survey. Arch Phys Med Rehabil. 2005 Oct;86(10):1910-9. 
Darnall BD, Ephraim P, Wegener ST, Dillingham T, Pezzin L, Rossbach P, MacKenzie EJ (2005). Depressive symptoms and mental health service utilization among persons with limb loss: results of a national survey. Arch Phys Med Rehabil. 2005 Apr;86(4):650-8. 
Castillo RC, MacKenzie EJ, Wegener ST, Bosse MJ, LEAP Study Group (2006). Prevalence of Chronic Pain Seven Years Following Limb Threatening Lower Extremity Trauma. Pain, 124, 321–329. 
Kortte KB, Wegener ST, Chwalisz K (2003). Anosognosia and denial: Their relationship to coping and depression in traumatic brain injury. Rehabilitation Psychology, 48, 131–136.
Haythornthwaite J, Wegener ST, Benrud-Larsen L, Clark M, Dillingham T, Cheng L, de Lateur B (2003). Factors associated with willingness to try different pain treatments after a spinal cord injury. Clinical Journal of Pain, 19, 31–38.
Palmer S, Wegener ST (2003). Rehabilitation psychology. Overview and key concepts. Md Med. 2003 Autumn;4(4):20-2. 
Yonan C, Wegener ST (2003). Pain management in older persons. Rehabilitation Psychology. 48, 4–13.
Transverse Myelitis Consortium Working Group (A Martinez-Arizala, G Barnes, S Benjamin, J Bowen, N Cutter, B de Lateur, D Dietrich, M Dowling, J Griffin, D Irani, P Jorens, A Kaplin, J Katz, D Kerr, C Levy, C Lucchinetti, J Lynn, R Mandler, J McDonald, L Morrison, C Pardo, F Pidcock, R Ransohoff, M Trovato, S Wegener, B Weinshenker, D Wingerchuk, T Vollmer). (2002). Proposed Diagnostic Criteria for Acute Transverse Myelitis, Neurology. 59, 499–505.
Wegener ST, Haythornthwaite JA (2001) Psychological and behavioral issues in the treatment of pain after spinal cord injury. Topics in Spinal Cord Injury, 7, 73–83.
Benrud-Larsen LM, Wegener ST (2000). Psychosocial aspects of chronic pain in neurehabilitation populations: Prevalence, Severity and Impact. Neurorehabilitation, 14, 127–137.
Benrud-Larson LM, Wegener ST (2000). Chronic pain in neurorehabilitation populations: Prevalence, severity and impact. NeuroRehabilitation. 2000;14(3):127-137. 
Wegener ST, Hagglund K, Elliott TR (2000). A reply to Thomas and Chan: On psychological identity and training. Rehabilitation Psychology, 45, 74–80.
Wegener ST, Hagglund K, Elliott TR (1998). On psychological identity and training: Boulder is better for rehabilitation psychology. Rehabilitation Psychology, 43, 17–29.
Wegener ST (1996). The rehabilitation ethic and ethics. Rehabilitation Psychology, 41, 5–17.
Wegener ST, Elliott TR (1992). Pain Assessment in Spinal Cord Injury. The Clinical Journal of Pain, 8, 93–101.  
Elliott, T.R. & Wegener, S.T. (Eds.). (1992). Chronic pain and spinal cord injury (Special section). The Clinical Journal of Pain, 8, 86–122.
Wegener ST (1991). Psychological aspects of rheumatic disease: The developing biopsychosocial framework. Current Opinion in Rheumatology, 3, 300–304. 
Wegener ST (1989). Adherence: are we preaching the truth? Arthritis Care Res. 1989 Sep;2(3):87-8. 
Wegener, ST (1989). Treatment of sleep disturbance in rheumatoid arthritis: A single-subject experiment. Arthritis Care and Research, 1, 205–210. 
Wegener, S.T. (1989). Cognitive, psychological and behavioral issues in aging and arthritis. Scandinavian Journal of Rheumatology, 82, 39–49. 
Stabenow C, O'Leary A, Wegener ST, Fang L, Brunner C (1988). A survey of arthritis rehabilitation in the United States. Archives of Physical Medicine and Rehabilitation, 69 54–60.
Kulp CS, O'Leary AA, Wegener ST, Fang WL, Brunner CM (1988). Inpatient arthritis rehabilitation programs in the US: results from a national survey. Arch Phys Med Rehabil. 1988 Oct;69(10):873-6. 
Schwartz DP, Large HS, Degood DE, Wegener ST, Rowlingson JC (1984). Chronic emergency room visitor with chest pain: Successful treatment by stress management and biofeedback. Pain. 18, 315 319. 
Swartzwelder HS, Wegener ST, Johnson CT, Dyer RS (1980). Depressed excitability and integrated EEGs following hippocampal afterdischarges. Brain Res Bull. 1980 Sep-Oct;5(5):509-7.

References

External links
Stephen T. Wegener via Johns Hopkins University Bloomberg School of Public Health

1952 births
Living people
21st-century American psychologists
Loyola University Maryland alumni
Saint Louis University alumni
20th-century American psychologists